Vasantsena is a Hindi film. It was released in 1942 directed by Gajanan Jagirdar.

References

External links
 

1942 films
1940s Hindi-language films
Indian black-and-white films
Films directed by Gajanan Jagirdar
Indian films based on plays
Films about courtesans in India